The MLS Goal of the Year Award (currently commercially termed "AT&T MLS Goal of the Year") is handed out annually since its inception in 1996 to a player in Major League Soccer (MLS) whose goal is selected in an on-line fan vote including the season's Goal of the Week Award winners.

Winners

References

Goal of the Year
Association football goal of the year awards